Warren Island State Park is state-owned island and public recreation area on Penobscot Bay in the town of Islesboro, Waldo County, Maine. The island was acquired by the state of Maine for one dollar in 1959. Hiking trails, campsites, and open-faced shelters are found on the island; a pier allows access by private boat.

References

External links
Warren Island State Park Department of Agriculture, Conservation and Forestry
Warren Island State Park Map Department of Agriculture, Conservation and Forestry

Islands of Waldo County, Maine
State parks of Maine
Protected areas of Waldo County, Maine
Campgrounds in Maine
Islands of Maine